Honey & the Bees were a girl group from Philadelphia who had a hit in 1971 with "It's Gonna Take A Miracle". Two of the members of the group would later become part of The Ritchie Family.

Background
According to one source, the group began as The Yum Yums.  They began in 1965 and recorded a single "Two Can Play the Same Game" bw "Inside O' Me" which was released on the Academy label. The A side was written by Phil Hurtt.  Not long after the single was released, the singers on the record had disappeared. With Hurtt keeping that sound in mind, he revived the name a year later with a different line up. This new line up consisted of Jean Davis, Nadine Felder, Gwendolyn Oliver and Cassandra Ann Wooten.

The group is remembered for their revival of The Royalettes hit, "It's Gonna Take a Miracle". Produced for them by Jimmy Bishop, it became a hit for them in 1971.

A couple of sources point to Fannie Lee Cobb of Fannie & the Varcels having a connection to the original line up. Other members of the first line up were allegedly Rita Graves and Lulu Martin.

Career
By May 1, 1965, a single "Two Can Play the Same Game" bw "Inside O' Me" was released on Academy 114. Credited to Honey & the Bees, it was given a four star rating in Billboard's May 1 issue, Spotlight Winners of the Week Pop section. The singers on the record were not Jean Davis, Nadine Felder, Gwendolyn Oliver or Cassandra Ann Wooten. They were Fannie Lee Cobb, Rita Graves and Lulu Martin.

New line up
With the new line up of Davis, Felder, Oliver and Wooten, they began their association with Arctic Records in 1966 and recorded a Kenny Gamble song, "On Time is Forever".

In 1970, their manager Jimmy Bishop moved them over to the Josie label.

In 1971, their single "We Got to Stay Together" was released on Josie 1028. Listed in the April 17 issue of Cashbox in their single reviews Picks of the Week section, it was said that it was certain to gain R&B action and pick up Top 40 momentum. The same year they had a hit with "It's Gonna Take a Miracle". After that they recorded two more singles which were released on the Bell label. The singles failed to make an impression and the group disbanded.

Later years
At some stage Cassandra Ann Wooten and Nadine Felder were asked to come to New York to do some background vocals on a song. Jacques Morali and Patrick Adams were co-producing the song. Morali said to them that if he ever were to put a girl group together then they would be called. And two years later he did call but by that time Felder had lost interest in doing secular music. Later Gwendolyn Oliver and Cassandra Ann Wooten joined with Cheryl Mason-Jacks to become The Ritchie Family. Wooten would also be part of Cas Mijac.

Gwen Oliver died on November 27, 2020 at age 71.

Discography

References

Further reading
 Girl Groups: Fabulous Females Who Rocked the World, HONEY AND THE BEES By John Clemente

American soul musical groups